Delta View Joint Union Elementary School District was a public school district based in Kings County, California, United States. In 2009, the district was absorbed by Kit Carson Elementary School District following a vote by the school board.

References

External links
 

School districts in Kings County, California